Capparis spinosa subsp. nummularia, the wild passionfruit, or (locally) caperbush, is an Australian native plant. It is a subspecies of the caper adapted to deserts.

Its name in the Arrernte language of Central Australia is Merne arrutnenge.

Wild passionfruit is a tasty bush tucker food. When it ripens, the skin turns orange and splits open and the little black seeds become visible. It is then ready to eat. The seeds are hot and spicy when crushed. It grows prolifically in riverbanks in the desert.

References
 Hiddins, L., Bush Tucker Field Guide, Explore Australia Publishing 2003,  page 48
 Low, T., Wild Food Plants of Australia, Angus & Robertson Publishers 1991,  page 173

spinosa subsp. nummularia
Bushfood
Australian Aboriginal bushcraft
Rosids of Western Australia
Flora of the Northern Territory
Flora of Queensland
Plant subspecies